Hypericum quadrangulum L. nom. rej. can refer to two different species of St. Johnswort:
 Hypericum maculatum Crantz
 Hypericum tetrapterum Fries